Helen Alma Newton Turner  (15 May 1908 – 26 November 1995) was an Australian geneticist and statistician. She was a leading authority on sheep genetics and worked at the Commonwealth Scientific and Industrial Research Organisation (CSIRO) for 40 years.

Biography
Helen Alma Newton Turner was born in Sydney, New South Wales, Australia on 15 May 1908. She received her BArch in 1930, graduating with honors from the University of Sydney. She worked briefly in an architect's office before taking a position as Ian Clunies Ross' secretary at the McMaster Animal Health Laboratory of the Council for Scientific and Industrial Research (now the Commonwealth Scientific and Industrial Research Organisation) in 1931. She developed an interest in statistics and Ross arranged for her to train in the United Kingdom with statisticians Frank Yates and Ronald Fisher. She returned to CSIRO in 1939 as a consulting statistician to the agency's Division of Animal Health and Production. Newton Turner formed the University Women's Land Army with marine biologist Isobel Bennett in 1940. She was a statistician for the Department of Home Security in Canberra  in 1942 and for the Department of Manpower in Sydney from 1943 to 1944. She worked as a statistician until about 1945 and in 1946 became a technical officer at the Division of Animal Health and Production.

In 1956, Newton Turner was made senior principal research scientist of CSIRO's Division of Animal Genetics and led sheep breeding research. She received her DSc from the University of Sydney in 1970 and continued at the Division of Animal Genetics in 1976. Newton Turner introduced objective, measurement-based approaches to sheep breeding and utilised quantitative genetics to improve wool quality and output from Merino sheep. From the late 1960s until the late 1980s, she travelled, assessing sheep development programs around the world.

The Association for the Advancement of Animal Breeding and Genetics established the Helen Newton Turner Medal in 1993. She died on 26 November 1995 in Sydney.

Awards

1953 – Queen Elizabeth II Coronation Medal
1974 – Farrer Memorial Medal
1977 – Officer of the Order of the British Empire (OBE)
1980 – FAO Ceres Medal
1985 – Rotary Medal for Vocational Excellence
1987 – Officer of the Order of Australia (AO)

References

Further reading
 

Australian geneticists
Australian statisticians
Women geneticists
Women statisticians
1908 births
1995 deaths
Australian women scientists
University of Sydney alumni
Officers of the Order of Australia
Australian Officers of the Order of the British Empire
Farrer Medal recipients
20th-century Australian scientists
20th-century biologists
20th-century women scientists
20th-century Australian mathematicians
20th-century women mathematicians
20th-century Australian women